Vasili Vasilyevich Postnov (24 March 1962 – 4 March 2009) was a Tajikistani professional footballer. He also held Russian citizenship.

Club career
He made his professional debut in the Soviet Top League in 1980 for FC Pakhtakor Tashkent.

Honours
Pamir Dushanbe
Tajikistan Higher League (1): 1992
Wydad Casablanca
Botola (1): 1992–93
CAF Champions League (1): 1992
Afro-Asian Cup (1): 1993

References

1962 births
Sportspeople from Tashkent
2009 deaths
Russian footballers
Soviet footballers
Tajikistani footballers
Tajikistan international footballers
Pakhtakor Tashkent FK players
CSKA Pamir Dushanbe players
FC Lokomotiv Moscow players
Wydad AC players
Tajikistani expatriate footballers
Expatriate footballers in Morocco
Tajikistani expatriate sportspeople in Morocco
Expatriate footballers in Russia
Soviet Top League players
Russian Premier League players
Association football midfielders